Nycteis is a genus of beetles in the family Carabidae, containing the following species:

 Nycteis alluaudi (Jeannel, 1949) 
 Nycteis apicalis (Fairmaire, 1904) 
 Nycteis brevicollis Laporte De Castelnau, 1834 
 Nycteis chloroptera (Alluaud, 1936) 
 Nycteis diegana (Jeannel, 1949) 
 Nycteis lampra (Alluaud, 1936) 
 Nycteis latiuscula Fairmaire, 1901 
 Nycteis madagascariensis (Gory, 1833) 
 Nycteis posticalis Fairmaire, 1901
 Nycteis posticula (Alluaud, 1936) 
 Nycteis pustulata (Chaudoir, 1843) 
 Nycteis scapulata Fairmaire, 1901 
 Nycteis sicardi (Jeannel, 1949) 
 Nycteis signatipennis (Chaudoir, 1869) 
 Nycteis stellulata (Fairmaire, 1897)

References

Lebiinae